Tallinn English College is a co-educational general education school in Tallinn, Estonia with in depth education in the English language. It has elementary, middle and senior levels with students aged from 7 to 18.

History
The history of the college starts in 1940, when Tallinn Secondary School No. 7 was created by merging Tallinn French School and Jakob Westholm Grammar School. The school was located in the building on Hariduse Street erected for the French Lyceum in 1937. Its name returned to Jakob Westholm Grammar School in 1941 under the German occupation authorities, but its original name was lost again in 1944 when the Soviet occupation was restored. The students had to survive more mergers with other schools. Finally the college became one of the few elite schools specializing in English in Soviet-occupied Estonia.

In 1996 the school was renamed to Tallinn English College and moved to its current location on Estonia Puiestee in the very heart of Tallinn.

Notable alumni
Yoko Alender, architect
Kaja Kallas, Prime Minister of Estonia
Jüri Krjukov, actor
Anu Lamp, actress
Rein Lang, Minister of Culture
 Mihkel Raud, singer, guitarist and journalist
 Riina Sildos, film producer
 Meeli Sööt, actress

References

External links

Schools in Tallinn
Educational institutions established in 1940
1940 establishments in Estonia